The Philadelphia Quakers were a professional American football team that competed in the first American Football League in 1926 and won the league's only championship.

History

Owned by L. S. Conway, the Quakers played their home games in Sesquicentennial Stadium on Saturdays because of Pennsylvania’s Blue laws prohibiting work or business on Sundays. Coached by Bob Folwell, the majority of the team played their college football in Pennsylvania. The Quakers had nine players (including Century Milstead, Charlie Way, Butch Spagna, and Bull Behman) who had previously played for various National Football League teams. The combined experience gave the team an edge in line play, particularly on defense (the Quakers yielded only five points per game for the 1926 season). The addition of All-American Glenn Killinger merely added to the defensive riches: he intercepted four passes in his league debut (November 4, 1926, in a 24-0 victory over the Rock Island Independents).

Unlike half of their league opponents, the Quakers had no financial connection with league founders C. C. Pyle and Red Grange. In addition to having a championship team, the Quakers drew well in the stadium in the midst of the Sesquicentennial Exposition. When the fair ended (early November), the audience in the soon-to-be renamed Municipal Stadium diminished, but still drew well when the Quakers defeated the New York Yankees 13-7 on a Bob Dinsmore punt return that decided the game - and the league championship (November 27, 1926).

At the time of the championship-clinching game, the AFL had only four active teams (the Quakers, the Yankees, the Los Angeles Wildcats, and the Chicago Bulls), three of which were being subsidized by C. C. Pyle and Red Grange. The latter three teams played games in the last two weeks of the season while the Quakers started challenging National Football League teams for a “pro football championship game.” The NFL champions Frankford Yellow Jackets were the first to refuse, claiming that their postseason schedule had been already set. Additional challenges by the Quakers were unanswered until Tim Mara, owner of the seventh place New York Giants, accepted the challenge, scheduling a game for December 12, 1926, at the Polo Grounds.

As the Yankees and the Bulls were playing the AFL's last official game (a 7-3 Yankees victory in Comiskey Park),  the Quakers and the Giants were battling in front of 5000 fans in the middle of a driving snowstorm. While the score was only 3–0 at halftime, Quaker errors led to the Giants winning the game 31–0. Both the Quakers and the AFL were no more.

At the end of the season, former NFL player Wilfred Smith of the Chicago Tribune presented a combined NFL-AFL All-Pro team in his column. Three Quakers were named to the second team: George Tully, Bull Behman, and Al Kreuz.

After the first AFL

Upon the completion of a New York Yankees 7–3 victory over the Chicago Bulls in Comiskey Park  on December 12, 1926, the first AFL was officially dead. The simultaneous 31-0 drubbing of the Quakers by the New York Giants in the Polo Grounds left the AFL champions in a similar state.

It was, however, not the end of the professional football career for five Philadelphia Quakers. The following men were on rosters of NFL teams in the 1927 season:

Bob Beattie – 1927 New York Yankees, 1929 Orange Tornadoes, 1930 Newark Tornadoes
Bull Behman – 1927–31 Frankford Yellow Jackets (player-coach 1930–31)
Adrian Ford – 1927 Pottsville Maroons, 1927 Frankford Yellow Jackets
Century Milstead – 1927–28 New York Giants
George Tully – 1927 Frankford Yellow Jackets

On the other hand, the pro football careers of several former NFL players ended with the 1926 Quakers:

Charlie Cartin – 1925 Frankford Yellow Jackets
Saville Crowther – 1925 Frankford Yellow Jackets
Doc Elliott – 1922–23 Canton Bulldogs, 1924–25 Cleveland Bulldogs
Glenn Killinger – 1921 Canton Bulldogs, 1926 New York Giants
Johnny Schott – 1920-23 Buffalo All-Americans
Butch Spagna – 1920 Cleveland Tigers, 1920-21 Buffalo All-Americans, 1924-25 Frankford Yellow Jackets
George Sullivan – 1924-25 Frankford Yellow Jackets
Whitey Thomas – 1924 Frankford Yellow Jackets
Charlie Way – 1921 Canton Bulldogs, 1924 Frankford Yellow Jackets

NOTE: Doc Elliott came out of retirement in 1931 to play for the Cleveland Indians.

Other Philadelphia Quakers teams 
The Quakers name and history traces back to the Philadelphia Quakers, who were operated by the Union Athletic Association of Phoenixville and played one season under Conway's ownership in 1921. The Quakers of that year, who had a perfect season and claimed the mythical national championship under the "Union AA" name in 1920, took advantage of the Saturday game schedule required by Pennsylvania's blue laws and would often "moonlight" the next day as members of the Buffalo All-Americans. The National Football League caught wind of this scheme and forced the moonlighting players to choose one team or the other. That team was poised to join the National Football League in 1922, but for reasons unexplained remained independent and instead merged into the Frankford Yellow Jackets that year.

References

External links
History of the Philadelphia Quakers

American Football League (1926) teams
American football teams in Philadelphia
Defunct American football teams in Pennsylvania
American football teams established in 1926
American football teams disestablished in 1926
1926 establishments in Pennsylvania
1926 disestablishments in Pennsylvania